Tulabi (also Romanized as Tūlābī and Ţūlābī; also known as Ţūlābī Harāsam) is a village in Harasam Rural District, Homeyl District, Eslamabad-e Gharb County, Kermanshah Province, Iran. At the 2006 census, its population was 585, in 131 families.

References 

Populated places in Eslamabad-e Gharb County